Rajan Singh also known as a Rajan Kumar Singh is a politician and leader of Bharatiya Janata Party and former member of the Bihar Legislative Council from Aurangabad district, Bihar.

References

Bharatiya Janata Party politicians from Bihar
Living people
Year of birth missing (living people)
People from Aurangabad district, Bihar
People from Deo, Bihar
Members of the Bihar Legislative Council